Henry Thorne Morton (18 December 1888 – 8 December 1966) was a New Zealand politician of the National Party.

Biography

Morton was born on 18 December 1888 at Auckland. He received his education at King's College, Auckland and Emmanuel College, Cambridge.

In 1946 the Waitemata electorate was abolished, and he was defeated for the new North Shore electorate by Martyn Finlay.

Notes

References
 

1888 births
1966 deaths
New Zealand National Party MPs
Members of the New Zealand House of Representatives
New Zealand MPs for Auckland electorates
Unsuccessful candidates in the 1946 New Zealand general election
Alumni of Emmanuel College, Cambridge
People educated at King's College, Auckland